Muhammad IV was the Shirvanshah from 981 to 991. He was the son and successor of Ahmad.

Reign 
In 981/82, Muhammad IV took the town of Qabala from its ruler, Abd al-Barr ibn Anbasa. In 982, he took control of Barda'a, and made Musa ibn Ali his lieutenant. In 983, a wall around the town of Shabaran was constructed under Muhammad IV's orders. In 989/90, the inhabitants of the town of al-Bab became enthusiastic supporters of Muhammad al-Tuzi, a preacher who had arrived from Gilan. The latter soon took over the entire town, and fell into disfavour with its ruler, Maymun. The supporters of al-Tuzi laid siege to the castle of Maymun, forcing him to flee to Tabarsaran in 990/91. 

Muhammad IV was subsequently invited by al-Tuzi to take control over al-Bab. He went to the town, staying there for some months and overseeing its administration. He was eventually taken back to Shirvan by his men after suffering a head injury from a battle-axe by Balid, a ghulams of Maymun, who subsequently reconquered al-Bab. Muhammad IV died in November 991 and was succeeded by his brother Yazid II.

Coinage and culture 
A coin struck under Muhammad IV at Barda'a is engraved with the nasab ibn as-Sallar, which demonstrates that Muhammad IV wanted to make it clear that he was the rightful heir of the Persian monarchs. "Sallar" is derived from sardar, a military title under the Sasanian Empire (224–651). Writing in the first half of the 10th-century, al-Masudi reported that Muhammad IV was "incontrovertibly" descended from the Sasanian monarch Bahram V Gur, which demonstrates the early Persianization of the Shirvanshahs.

References

Sources 
 
 
 
 
 

10th-century rulers in Asia
991 deaths
Year of birth unknown